Elodea is a genus of 6 species of aquatic plants often called the waterweeds described as a genus in 1803. Classified in the frog’s-bit family (Hydrocharitaceae), Elodea is native to the Americas and is also widely used as aquarium vegetation and laboratory demonstrations of cellular activities. It lives in fresh water. An older name for this genus is Anacharis, which serves as a common name in North America.

The introduction of some species of Elodea into waterways in parts of Europe, Australia, Africa, Asia, and New Zealand has created a significant problem and it is now considered a noxious weed in these areas.

Elodea canadensis, sometimes called American or Canadian water weed or pond weed, is widely known as the generic water weed. The use of these names causes it to be confused with similar-looking plants, like Brazilian elodea (Egeria densa) or hydrilla (Hydrilla verticillata). American water weed is an attractive aquarium plant and is a good substitute for Brazilian elodea. It can be used for science experiments in classrooms demonstrating how plants use carbon dioxide with the usage of bromothymol blue.

The American water weed lives entirely underwater with the exception of small white flowers which bloom at the surface and are attached to the plant by delicate stalks. It produces winter buds from the stem tips that overwinter on the lake bottom. It also often overwinters as an evergreen plant in mild climates. In the Autumn, leafy stalks will detach from the parent plant, float away, root, and start new plants. This is the American water weed's most important method of spreading, while seed production plays a relatively minor role.

Silty sediments and water rich in nutrients favor the growth of American water weed in nutrient-rich lakes. However, the plants will grow in a wide range of conditions, from very shallow to deep water, and in many sediment types. It can even continue to grow uprooted, as floating fragments. It is found throughout temperate North America, where it is one of the most common aquatic plants.

American water weed is an important part of lake ecosystems. It provides good habitat for many aquatic invertebrates and cover for young fish and amphibians. Waterfowl, especially ducks, as well as beaver, muskrat and aquatic turtles eat this plant. It is also of economic importance as an attractive and easy to keep aquarium plant, although in the states of Alabama, New Hampshire, New York, South Carolina, and Washington it has been deemed an invasive species and is illegal to sell.

Species
 Elodea bifoliata H.St.John - Canada (AB, SK), W United States (OR + CA to NM + MN) 
 Elodea callitrichoides (Rich.) Casp. - Argentina, Uruguay 
 Elodea canadensis Michx. - most of United States + Canada 
 Elodea granatensis Humb. & Bonpl. - much of South America 
 Elodea nuttallii (Planch.) H.St.John - much of United States + Canada 
 Elodea potamogeton (Bertero) Espinosa - Chile, Peru, Bolivia, Ecuador

Chemical control 
Chemical methods are ineffective in eradicating Elodea – at best they only slow growth for a season or two. As Elodea spreads into new ecosystems, it experiences rapid growth for 5–6 years and then slows as soil nutrients are used up. Elodea is threatening aquatic environments across Europe. Chemicals may be used in places that cause undue economic concerns, but very few aquatic herbicides are registered for aquatic use in the EU. Fluridone, the most commonly used aquatic herbicide is highly effective against Hydrilla, but only marginally effective against Elodea, especially at lower use rates.

Mechanical control 

The plants can also be removed from lakes and rivers mechanically. They are extracted either by hand or by using rakes, chains, mowing boats or weed buckets. The problem is that through vegetative reproduction via fragments, mechanical removal methods can contribute to the spread of the plant. Torn fragments can be transported downstream or are introduced to new environments via attachment to boats and anchor chains.

See also
 Stormy Lake (Alaska) a lake where Fluoridone was successfully used to eliminate elodea

References

External links 
 
 Jepson Manual Treatment

Hydrocharitaceae
Hydrocharitaceae genera
Freshwater plants
Aquarium plants